William Brown (born 1930) is a Northern Irish former politician with the Ulster Unionist Party.

Life
A farmer by profession Brown was active in both the Ulster Unionists and the Orange Order, and served as a member of Down District Council from 1977 to 1993. Elected to the Northern Ireland Assembly in 1982 for South Down he served as deputy chair of that body's Agriculture Committee.

References

1930 births
Living people
Ulster Unionist Party politicians
Northern Ireland MPAs 1982–1986